Idiolychnus urolampus is a species of lanternfish known from the Pacific and Indian Oceans.  This species grows to a length of  SL.

References
 

Myctophidae
Monotypic marine fish genera